Gorskaya is a rural locality (a village) in Sylvenskoye Rural Settlement, Permsky District, Perm Krai, Russia. The population was 17 as of 2010. There are 9 streets.

Geography 
Gorskaya is located 35 km northeast of Perm (the district's administrative centre) by road. Lyady is the nearest rural locality.

References 

Rural localities in Permsky District